Don Michael Crites (born June 16, 1948) is an American politician and member of the Republican Party and former United States Attorney for the Southern District of Ohio in the administrations of Presidents Ronald Reagan and George H. W. Bush. He was a candidate for Ohio Attorney General in 2008. He currently resides in Powell, Ohio.

Early life and education 
Crites was born in Bluffton, Ohio and raised in Lima, Ohio. Upon graduation from Lima Shawnee High School in 1966, he received an appointment to the United States Naval Academy and graduated in 1970. He was commissioned an officer in the United States Navy and served in the United States Navy and Naval Reserve until October 1999 retiring with the rank of Captain.

He received his B.S. from the United States Naval Academy and his J.D. from Ohio Northern University Pettit College of Law in 1978.

Naval career 
Crites is a retired captain in the United States Naval Reserve. He studied at the Naval War College and Industrial College of the Armed Forces. He also served as Deputy Commander for Mission Effectiveness, Naval Reserve Readiness Command Region 8 in Jacksonville, Florida.

A Vietnam veteran, Crites received the Legion of Merit, Meritorious Service Medal, Joint Service Commendation Medal, Navy Commendation Medal, the Navy Achievement Medal, and various campaign and service awards, including the Vietnam Service Medal and Vietnam Campaign Medal.

A member of the Veterans of Foreign Wars, Crites was inducted into the Ohio Veterans Hall of Fame in 2000.

U.S. Attorney 
Crites was nominated in 1986 by President Ronald Reagan and confirmed by a vote of the United States Senate to be the United States Attorney for the Southern District of Ohio. He served in that position from 1986 to 1993 in the administrations of Presidents Reagan and Bush.

During his tenure as U.S. Attorney, Crites prosecuted Pete Rose.

Legal practice 
Crites' legal career has included service as United States Attorney for the Southern District of Ohio, Assistant United States Attorney, First Assistant Prosecuting Attorney (Delaware County), Assistant Prosecuting Attorney (Allen County), City Prosecutor (Lima, Ohio) and City law director for several central Ohio communities. He joined the law firm of Dinsmore & Shohl, LLP in Columbus, Ohio in 2008, focusing on white collar defense, government investigations and regulatory enforcement. Crites was previously a managing partner of the "mid-size" Columbus law firm, Rich, Crites & Dittmer, where he specialized in "complex civil cases and defending manufacturers in product-liability claims," According to the Columbus Dispatch.

2008 election for Ohio Attorney General 
Crites announced his candidacy for Ohio Attorney General on July 23, 2008, as a Republican running against Democrat Richard Cordray and Independent Robert M. Owens in a special election for attorney general that was held when the previous officeholder, Democrat Marc Dann, who was embroiled in a sex scandal, resigned on May 14, 2008. Potential Republican candidates, including Montgomery, Jim Petro, DeWine, Maureen O'Connor, and Rob Portman declined to enter the race. According to the Columbus Dispatch, Cordray had a large financial advantage over his opponents with approximately 30 times as much campaign financing as Crites.

Crites' campaign strategies included attempts to link Cordray with Dann—an association The Columbus Dispatch called into question—and promoting himself as having more years of prosecutorial experience. Cordray asserted that he managed the state's money safely despite the turbulence of the financial crisis of 2007–2008.

He received 38% of the vote.

References

External links 
 Official campaign website

1948 births
American people of Pennsylvania Dutch descent
Claude W. Pettit College of Law alumni
Living people
Naval War College alumni
Ohio lawyers
Ohio Northern University alumni
Ohio Republicans
People from Bluffton, Ohio
People from Powell, Ohio
Recipients of the Legion of Merit
United States Attorneys for the Southern District of Ohio
United States Naval Academy alumni
Politicians from Lima, Ohio
United States Navy officers